Walter Pérez (1 November 1924 – 30 December 2009) was a Uruguayan sprinter. He competed in the men's 100 metres at the 1948 Summer Olympics.

Competition record

References

External links
 

1924 births
2009 deaths
Athletes (track and field) at the 1948 Summer Olympics
Uruguayan male sprinters
Olympic athletes of Uruguay
Sportspeople from Montevideo
20th-century Uruguayan sportspeople
21st-century Uruguayan people